Tessa Schram (born 18 October 1988) is a Dutch actress and director. She is the daughter of film producer and director Dave Schram and Maria Peters and the sister of actor Quinten Schram.

Filmography

Films

As director
 Sammie is Looking (2011)
 Lost and Found (2012)
 Painkillers (2014)
 Kappen (2016)
 100% Coco (2017)

As assistant director
 Guilty Movie (2012)
 Graffiti Detective (2013)
 Raaf (2015)

As writer
 Painkillers (2014)

As actress
 Een echte hond (1998) as Tessa
 Little Crumb (1999) as a child mother of Keesie
 Peter Bell II: The Hunt for the Czar Crown (2003) as Marie
 Keep Off (2006) as Fleur

Miscellaneous
 Radeloos (2008)
 Bukowski (2010)
 Arigato (2012)
 Regret! (2013)
 Kroost (2014)

Television series

As director
 Dagboek van een callgirl (2015)
 SpangaS (2016)

As script writer
 Marathon Girl (2008)

As actress
 Grijpstra & de Gier: Lekkere jongens (2006) as Nancy
 Spoorloos verdwenen: De verdwenen leraar (2007) as Eline Buisel

Miscellaneous
 Marathon Girl (2008)

On the cover
Maren Stoffels wrote her fourth book Freckles Love with Tessa on the cover, released in 2007.

References

External links

1988 births
Living people
People from Amstelveen
Dutch film actresses
Dutch television actresses
Dutch women film directors
20th-century Dutch actresses
21st-century Dutch actresses